"Gimme Gimme Good Lovin'" is a song written by Joey Levine and Ritchie Cordell and performed by Crazy Elephant. It reached #12 on both the Billboard Hot 100 and the UK Singles Chart in 1969, and was featured on their 1969 album, Crazy Elephant.

The single was first released in January 1969, with "Hips and Lips" as the B-side, but it did not become a hit until re-released in March 1969.

It was produced by Joey Levine and Artie Resnick and arranged by Levine.

The single ranked #89 on the Billboard Year-End Hot 100 singles of 1969.

Chart history

Weekly charts

Year-end charts

Other versions
In 1969 (the same year as Crazy Elephant's release) Don Fardon released a version as a single in Australia.
Also in 1969 Dusty Springfield performed a version live on her BBC TV show "Decidedly Dusty."
Also in 1969 Sonny Stitt released a version as a single that was featured on his album Come Hither.
In 1970 Giorgio Moroder released a version on his album That's Bubblegum - That's Giorgio also known as Giorgio.
In 1975 Brian Cadd released a version in the United Kingdom.
In 1976 Danish band Morning After Rich released a version in their country.
In 1979 Adrenalin released a version on Musical Signature Records
In 1980 Leif Garrett released a version on his album Can't Explain.
In 1984 Helix released a version as a single in Canada off their album Walkin' the Razor's Edge.
In 1987 I Nuovi Angeli released an Italian version on their album Color Cioccolata, titled "Balla, Balla Con Noi".
In 2000 Sonny Geraci released a live version off his album "On The Verge."

See also
 List of 1960s one-hit wonders in the United States

References

1969 songs
1969 singles
1975 singles
1984 singles
Songs written by Ritchie Cordell
Crazy Elephant songs
Giorgio Moroder songs
Leif Garrett songs
Helix (band) songs
Bell Records singles
Solid State Records singles
Capitol Records singles
Songs written by Joey Levine